John Randolph Goodin (December 14, 1836 – December 18, 1885) was a nineteenth-century politician, lawyer, judge and editor from Ohio and Kansas.

Born in Tiffin, Ohio, Goodin moved to Kenton, Ohio with his father in 1844. He attended Kenton High School and Geneva College, studied law and was admitted to the bar in 1857, commencing practice in Kenton. He moved to Humboldt, Kansas in 1859, was elected to the Kansas House of Representatives in 1866 and was judge of the seventh judicial district of Kansas from 1868 to 1876. Goodin was elected a Democrat to the United States House of Representatives in 1874, serving from 1875 to 1877, being unsuccessful for reelection in 1876. Afterwards, he was editor of the Inter State in Humboldt, Kansas and moved to Kansas City, Kansas in 1883 where he died on December 18, 1885. He was interred in Oak Grove Cemetery in Kansas City.

External links

 John Randolph Goodin at PerryCoFamiles.org  Perry County, Ohio

1836 births
1885 deaths
People from Tiffin, Ohio
Democratic Party members of the Kansas House of Representatives
Kansas state court judges
Ohio lawyers
Kansas lawyers
American newspaper editors
Politicians from Kansas City, Kansas
People from Kenton, Ohio
Geneva College alumni
Democratic Party members of the United States House of Representatives from Kansas
19th-century American journalists
American male journalists
19th-century American male writers
19th-century American politicians
People from Humboldt, Kansas
Journalists from Ohio
19th-century American judges
19th-century American lawyers